The five Marsh Awards for Ornithology are among over 40 Marsh Awards issued in the United Kingdom by the Marsh Charitable Trust and the British Trust for Ornithology (BTO), in the field of ornithology.

The Marsh Award for Ornithology 

Given:

The Marsh Local Ornithology Award 

Given:

The Marsh Award for Innovative Ornithology 

Introduced in 2012 to celebrate:

The Marsh Award for International Ornithology 

Introduced in 2013 and awarded to:

The Marsh Award for Young Ornithologist 

Introduced in 2015 and awarded to:

See also

 List of ornithology awards

References 

Ornithology awards
British Trust for Ornithology
British awards